Rio Hondo is a city in Cameron County, Texas, United States. The population was 2,356 at the 2010 census. It may be included as part of the Brownsville–Harlingen–Raymondville and the Matamoros–Brownsville metropolitan areas.

Geography

Rio Hondo is located in north-central Cameron County at  (26.234451, –97.581364).

Demographics

2020 census

As of the 2020 United States census, there were 2,021 people, 847 households, and 626 families residing in the city.

2000 census
As of the census of 2000, there were 1,942 people, 588 households, and 476 families residing in the city. The population density was 1,394.3 people per square mile (539.4/km). There were 787 housing units at an average density of 565.1 per square mile (218.6/km). The racial makeup of the city was 77.19% White, 0.05% African American, 0.26% Native American, 0.26% Asian, 0.05% Pacific Islander, 20.49% from other races, and 1.70% from two or more races. Hispanic or Latino of any race were 82.75% of the population.

There were 588 households, out of which 41.8% had children under the age of 18 living with them, 62.9% were married couples living together, 13.8% had a female householder with no husband present, and 19.0% were non-families. 17.5% of all households were made up of individuals, and 9.7% had someone living alone who was 65 years of age or older. The average household size was 3.30 and the average family size was 3.78.

In the city, the population was spread out, with 32.7% under the age of 18, 9.0% from 18 to 24, 25.5% from 25 to 44, 19.4% from 45 to 64, and 13.4% who were 65 years of age or older. The median age was 32 years. For every 100 females, there were 93.8 males. For every 100 females age 18 and over, there were 87.0 males.

The median income for a household in the city was $26,250, and the median income for a family was $27,941. Males had a median income of $21,125 versus $16,902 for females. The per capita income for the city was $9,871. About 25.7% of families and 28.8% of the population were below the poverty line, including 35.9% of those under age 18 and 25.3% of those age 65 or over.

Government and infrastructure
The United States Postal Service operates the Rio Hondo Post Office.

Education
Rio Hondo is served by the Rio Hondo Independent School District. Rio Hondo Elementary School, Rio Hondo Intermediate School, Rio Hondo Middle School, and Rio Hondo High School serve Rio Hondo.

In addition, residents are eligible to apply to South Texas Independent School District's magnet schools.

The Rio Hondo Public Library is located in Rio Hondo. A group of retired teachers started the library in 1979.

References

External links

 City of Rio Hondo official website
 Rio Hondo, Tx in Handbook of Texas Online

Cities in Cameron County, Texas
Cities in Texas